Mladen Pelaić (born 20 August 1983 in Zagreb) is a Croatian retired football player who last played for NK Rudeš.

Club career
He joined Standard Liège from NK Zagreb in summer 2006, signed 3-year deal, but 6 months later he was back to Croatia to join Hajduk Split, again signed 3-year deal.

International career
He has been capped for the Croatian national youth team and has participated in UEFA U-19 and U-21 tournaments.

References

External links
 

1983 births
Living people
Footballers from Zagreb
Association football fullbacks
Croatian footballers
Croatia under-21 international footballers
NK Zagreb players
Standard Liège players
HNK Hajduk Split players
NK Osijek players
NK Lučko players
NK Rudeš players
Croatian Football League players
Belgian Pro League players
Croatian expatriate footballers
Expatriate footballers in Belgium
Croatian expatriate sportspeople in Belgium